The 2016–17 Elon Phoenix women's basketball team represented Elon University during the 2016–17 NCAA Division I women's basketball season. The Phoenix, led by sixth year head coach Charlotte Smith, played their home games at Alumni Gym and were third year members of the Colonial Athletic Association (CAA). They finished the season 27–7, 16–2 in CAA play to win the CAA regular season title. They also won the CAA Tournament Championship for the first time in school history and earned their first ever bid to the NCAA women's basketball tournament. They lost in the first round to West Virginia.

Roster

Schedule

|-
!colspan=9 style="background:#910028; color:#CDB87D;"| Exhibition

|-
!colspan=9 style="background:#910028; color:#CDB87D;"| Non-conference regular season

|-
!colspan=9 style="background:#910028; color:#CDB87D;"| CAA regular season

|-
!colspan=9 style="background:#910028; color:#CDB87D;"| CAA Women's Tournament

|-
!colspan=9 style="background:#910028; color:#CDB87D;"| NCAA Women's Tournament

Rankings

See also 
2016–17 Elon Phoenix men's basketball team

References 

Elon Phoenix women's basketball seasons
Elon
Elon